Melanie "Mel" Bush is a fictional character played by Bonnie Langford in the long-running British science fiction television series Doctor Who. A computer programmer from the 20th century who is a companion of the Sixth and Seventh Doctors, she was a regular in the programme from 1986 to 1987. Mel appeared in six stories (20 episodes), and is the penultimate companion of the classic series.

Character biography
Mel first appears in the serial Terror of the Vervoids, part of the 14-part story The Trial of a Time Lord. At this point, she and the Sixth Doctor have been travelling together for some time. The events of Vervoids are shown as part of a Matrix projection of future events being shown by the Sixth Doctor to the court, so, from his point of view, he is seeing an adventure he will have with Mel even before he meets her in his own timeline. She is subsequently summoned to the courtroom herself. At the end of Trial, the Sixth Doctor leaves with this future Mel, intending to return her to her correct time. (This scenario is portrayed by The Trial of a Time Lord screenwriters Pip and Jane Baker in their novelisation of the final segment of that season, The Ultimate Foe.)

Mel is at present the only one of the Doctor's companions never to have her actual first adventure with the Doctor chronicled on screen. Series producer John Nathan-Turner indicated his intent to chronicle this adventure in Season 24, which would have followed Trial of a Time Lord. However, the subsequent departure of lead actor Colin Baker prior to production of the new season made this impossible.

Mel is a computer programmer from the 20th century who originates from the village of Pease Pottage in West Sussex, England. She has an eidetic memory, and a cheery, almost perky personality. She greets most situations with a warm smile and good humour, and is an optimist whose views extend to believing the best of people's natures, but can also scream with the best of them. She is a health enthusiast and a vegetarian, often encouraging the slightly portly Sixth Doctor to exercise more and drink carrot juice. She is present (albeit unconscious at the time) when the Sixth Doctor regenerates into his seventh incarnation, and continues to travel with him.
In the serial Dragonfire, she reunites with the galactic confidence trickster, Sabalom Glitz, whom she met in The Trial of a Time Lord and decides to travel with him aboard the Nosferatu II, leaving the Seventh Doctor with new companion Ace.

Langford reprised her role as Mel in the 2022 special, "The Power of the Doctor", alongside several other former companions who have gathered together as a support group to talk of their experiences with the Doctor.

Appearances in other media
The novelisation of The Ultimate Foe includes a scene in which the Sixth Doctor returns Mel to his future self at the point she was taken from, with the Virgin Missing Adventures novel Time of Your Life stating this was during an adventure on the planet Oxyveguramosa. The Past Doctor Adventures Business Unusual, by Gary Russell, covers the first meeting between Mel and the Sixth Doctor and establishes that she comes from 1989. The novel Spiral Scratch, also by Russell, reveals that Mel's middle name is Jane and that she was born on 22 July 1964 (Langford's actual birthday). The 2013 Big Finish audio The Wrong Doctors, which begins with the Doctor immediately after his trial taking Mel to Pease Pottage, also depicts Mel's first adventure (from her perspective) with the Doctor. However, this adventure takes place in a pocket universe created by a mysterious creature identified only as a 'time demon' that attempted to cause a temporal paradox by luring two different versions of the Sixth Doctor into its realm and then trying to kill the younger Doctor; the 'older' Sixth Doctor is from a point shortly after he parted company with Evelyn Smythe, while the younger has just left his trial while trying to take the older Mel somewhere where his future self can collect her. The young Mel of this pocket dimension, identified by the older Mel as being from a point six months before she met the Doctor officially, is killed during the crisis, but these events are subsequently erased, and the two Sixth Doctors decide to let fate decide when they will meet Mel, with the older advising the younger to travel to the point where he would meet Evelyn while he resumes his own travels.

Mel's history after she leaves the Seventh Doctor is not explored in the series. However, some of the spin-off novels and short stories add to her history. In the Virgin New Adventures novel Head Games by Steve Lyons, it is revealed that Glitz tired of Mel and left her on the decrepit leisure world Avalone. Mel was left here for months until she was finally saved by Jason and the fictional Dr Who. It is revealed that her decision to leave the Doctor was actually due to psychic persuasion on the Doctor's part, so he can go on to become the darker and more manipulative Time's Champion. Mel confronts the Seventh Doctor over this, and at the end of the novel he returns her to 20th century Earth and Pease Pottage (the short story "Business as Usual" by Gary Russell, published in the anthology More Short Trips).

In Heritage by Dale Smith, it is revealed that at some point Mel travels in time and space again, ending up on the planet Heritage, where she dies in the 61st century. However, this story takes place during a story arc in which enemies of the Doctor are attempting to eliminate his companions from the timeline, so Mel's fate in Heritage may be part of an alternate destiny that vanishes once those enemies are defeated.

The unofficial novel Time's Champion provides more details on how the Doctor became Time's Champion and Mel's involvement. However, this book was published unofficially (after being rejected), and its canonical status is thus even more unclear than for official spin-off material. This book also offers a different explanation for the Sixth Doctor's regeneration than both the televised series of events in Time and the Rani and the official novel Spiral Scratch.

Bonnie Langford played Mel once again in the 1993 charity special, Dimensions in Time, and has voiced the character in a series of audio plays from Big Finish Productions, alongside Colin Baker and Sylvester McCoy as the Sixth and Seventh Doctors. Langford has also voiced an alternative, more cynical version of Mel in the Doctor Who Unbound play He Jests at Scars....

In the Seventh Doctor audio A Life of Crime, Mel is reunited with the Seventh Doctor and Ace when the three become caught up in a complex plan by some of Sabalom Glitz's former associates to rob a high-tech vault, this gang attempting to trick Mel into helping them by having one of their number pose as the Doctor's new incarnation. The contents of the vault are revealed to be a temporal life-form that has apparently consumed some of Mel's possible futures during her time with Glitz. When the crisis is over, the Doctor realizes that the TARDIS has been tracking Mel on its last few materialisations, its last few materialisations seeing it arrive on planets that had just been visited by Mel, and invites her to rejoin their travels.

The canonicity of non-television stories is unclear.

List of appearances

Television

Season 23

Terror of the Vervoids
The Ultimate Foe

Season 24

Time and the Rani
Paradise Towers
Delta and the Bannermen
Dragonfire

30th anniversary special
Dimensions in Time
2022 specials
"The Power of the Doctor"

Audio dramas

Doctor Who: The Monthly Adventures

Sixth Doctor
The One Doctor
The Juggernauts
Catch-1782
Thicker than Water
The Wishing Beast & The Vanity Box
The Wrong Doctors
Spaceport Fear
The Seeds of War

Seventh Doctor
The Fires of Vulcan
Bang-Bang-a-Boom!
Flip-Flop
Unregenerate!
Red
Terror of the Sontarans
We Are The Daleks
The Warehouse
A Life of Crime
Fiesta of the Damned
Maker of Demons
The High Price of Parking
The Blood Furnace
The Silurian Candidate
Red Planets
The Dispossessed
The Quantum Possibility Engine

Doctor Who: The Sixth Doctor Adventures

The Sixth Doctor: The Last Adventure
The Brink of Death
Water Worlds
The Rotting Deep
The Tides of the Moon
Maelstrom
Purity Undreamed
The Mindless Ones
Reverse Engineering
Chronomancer

Doctor Who: The Seventh Doctor Adventures

Silver & Ice
Bad Day in Tinseltown
The Ribos Inheritance

Doctor Who: The Lost Stories
Mind of the Hodiac

Doctor Who: Special Releases
Peladon
The Death of Peladon

Doctor Who Unbound
He Jests at Scars...

Doctor Who: Short Trips

Intuition
Mel-evolent
The Devil's Footprints
Loud and Proud

Novels
Virgin New Adventures
Head Games by Steve Lyons
Just War by Lance Parkin (Appears primarily in flashback)
Virgin Missing Adventures
Millennial Rites by Craig Hinton
Past Doctor Adventures
Business Unusual by Gary Russell
The Quantum Archangel by Craig Hinton (Spends some time in an alternate timeline where she interacts with the Third Doctor)
Instruments of Darkness by Gary Russell
Heritage by Dale Smith (Primarily in flashbacks as the Doctor investigates her death)
Spiral Scratch by Gary Russell (Interacts with multiple alternate versions of herself)

Short stories
"Brief Encounter: A Wee Deoch an..?" by Colin Baker (Doctor Who Magazine Winter Special 1991)
"Fegovy" by Gareth Roberts (Decalog 3: Consequences)
"The Man Who Wouldn’t Give Up" by Nev Fountain (Short Trips: Past Tense)
"Mortal Thoughts" by Trevor Baxendale (Short Trips: Life Science)
"Sold Out" by Danny Oz (Short Trips: A Day in the Life)
"The Invertebrates of Doom" by Andrew Collins (Short Trips: Zodiac)
"Daisy Chain" by Xanna Eve Chown (Short Trips: 2040)
"Uranus" by Craig Hinton (Short Trips: The Solar System)
"Special Weapons" by Paul Leonard (More Short Trips)
"The Eyes Have It" by Colin Harvey (Short Trips: Snapshots)
"24 Crawford Street" by Ian Farrington (Short Trips: The Ghosts of Christmas)
"Dr Cadabra" by Trevor Baxendale (Short Trips: The Ghosts of Christmas)
"Driftwood" by Dale Smith (Short Trips: Transmissions)
"The Jumping of the Shark" by Steve Graeme and Adrian Middleton (Shelf Life)
"The Finest Restaurant Known to Man" by Jon Arnold (Shelf Life)

Comics
"Plastic Millennium" by Gareth Roberts and Martin Geraghty (Doctor Who Winter Special 1994)

References

External links

 Melanie Bush on the BBC's Doctor Who website

Television characters introduced in 1986
Doctor Who audio characters
Doctor Who companions
British female characters in television
Fictional English people
Fictional programmers
Fictional characters with eidetic memory
Fictional people from the 20th-century
Fictional vegan and vegetarian characters